Barton Turn is a village in Staffordshire, England. For population details taken at the 2011 Census see Barton-under-Needwood.

See also
Listed buildings in Barton-under-Needwood

Villages in Staffordshire